In literary criticism, a bildungsroman (plural bildungsromane) is a literary genre that focuses on the psychological and moral growth of the protagonist from childhood to adulthood (coming of age), in which character change is important.

Origin
The term was coined in 1819 by philologist Johann Karl Simon Morgenstern in his university lectures, and was later famously reprised by Wilhelm Dilthey, who legitimized it in 1870 and popularized it in 1905. The genre is further characterized by a number of formal, topical, and thematic features. The term coming-of-age novel is sometimes used interchangeably with bildungsroman, but its use is usually wider and less technical.

The birth of the bildungsroman is normally dated to the publication of Wilhelm Meister's Apprenticeship by Johann Wolfgang von Goethe in 1795–96, or, sometimes, to Christoph Martin Wieland's  of 1767. Although the bildungsroman arose in Germany, it has had extensive influence first in Europe and later throughout the world. Thomas Carlyle's English translation of Goethe's novel (1824) and his own Sartor Resartus (1833–34), the first English bildungsroman, inspired many British novelists. In the 20th century, it spread to  France and several other countries around the globe.

The genre translates fairly directly into the cinematic form, the coming-of-age film.

Plot outline
A bildungsroman is a growing up or "coming of age" of a generally naive person who goes in search of answers to life's questions with the expectation that these will result in gaining experience of the world. The genre evolved from folklore tales of a dunce or youngest child going out in the world to seek their fortune. Usually in the beginning of the story, there is an emotional loss which makes the protagonist leave on their journey. In a bildungsroman, the goal is maturity, and the protagonist achieves it gradually and with difficulty. The genre often features a main conflict between the main character and society. Typically, the values of society are gradually accepted by the protagonist and they are ultimately accepted into society—the protagonist's mistakes and disappointments are over. In some works, the protagonist is able to reach out and help others after having achieved maturity.

Franco Moretti "argues that the main conflict in the Bildungsroman is the myth of modernity with its overvaluation of youth and progress as it clashes with the static teleological vision of happiness and reconciliation found in the endings of Goethe's Wilhelm Meister and even Jane Austen's Pride and Prejudice".

There are many variations and subgenres of bildungsroman that focus on the growth of an individual. An Entwicklungsroman ("development novel") is a story of general growth rather than self-cultivation. An Erziehungsroman ("education novel") focuses on training and formal schooling, while a Künstlerroman ("artist novel") is about the development of an artist and shows a growth of the self. Furthermore, some memoirs and published journals can be regarded as bildungsroman although being predominantly factual (e.g. The Dharma Bums by Jack Kerouac or The Motorcycle Diaries by Ernesto "Che" Guevara). The term is also more loosely used to describe coming-of-age films and related works in other genres.

Examples

Precursors
 , by Ibn Tufail (12th century)
  (first edition 1554)
  by Baltasar Gracián (first edition 1651). Usually considered the pioneering work in its modern form.

18th century
 Memoirs of a Woman of Pleasure (Fanny Hill), by John Cleland (1748)
 The History of Tom Jones, a Foundling, by Henry Fielding (1749)
 Candide, by Voltaire (1759)
 The Life and Opinions of Tristram Shandy, Gentleman, by Laurence Sterne (1759)
 , by Christoph Martin Wieland (1767)—often considered the first "true" bildungsroman
 Wilhelm Meister's Apprenticeship by Johann Wolfgang Goethe (1795–96)

19th century
 The Betrothed, by Alessandro Manzoni (1827)
 The Red and The Black, by Stendhal (1830)
 Sartor Resartus, by Thomas Carlyle (1833–34)
 Jane Eyre, by Charlotte Brontë (1847)
 Wuthering Heights by Emily Brontë (1847)
 , by Fyodor Dostoevsky (1849)
 David Copperfield, by Charles Dickens (1850)
 Green Henry, by Gottfried Keller (1855)
 The Morgesons, by Elizabeth Stoddard (1862)
 Great Expectations, by Charles Dickens (1861)
 Little Women, by Louisa May Alcott (1869)
 Sentimental Education, by Gustave Flaubert (1869)
 The Adolescent, by Fyodor Dostoevsky (1875)
 What Maisie Knew, by Henry James (1897)

20th century
 Kim, by Rudyard Kipling (1901)
 Martin Eden, by Jack London (1909)
 The Book of Khalid, by Ameen Rihani (1911)
 Sons and Lovers, by D. H. Lawrence (1913)
 A Portrait of the Artist as a Young Man, by James Joyce (1916)
 Demian, by Hermann Hesse (1919)
 This Side of Paradise by F. Scott Fitzgerald (1920)
 The Magic Mountain by Thomas Mann (1924)
 Pather Panchali, by Bibhutibhushan Bandopadhyay (1929)
 The Catcher in the Rye by J. D. Salinger (1951)
 Children of Violence by Doris Lessing (1952–1969)
 In the Castle of My Skin, by George Lamming (1953)
 A Separate Peace by John Knowles (1956)
 Goodbye, Columbus, by Philip Roth (1959)
 To Kill a Mockingbird, by Harper Lee (1960)
 Wake in Fright, by Kenneth Cook (1961)
 The Emperor of Ice-Cream, by Brian Moore (1965)
 Dune, by Frank Herbert (1965)
 The Outsiders by S. E. Hinton (1967)
 A Wizard of Earthsea, by Ursula K. Le Guin (1968)
 Bright Lights, Big City by Jay McInerney (1984)
 Ender's Game by Orson Scott Card (1985)
 Oranges Are Not the Only Fruit by Jeanette Winterson (1985)
 Norwegian Wood by Haruki Murakami (1987)
 English Music by Peter Ackroyd (1992)
 The Perks of Being a Wallflower by Stephen Chbosky (1999)
 Naruto by Masashi Kishimoto (1999)
 Persepolis by Marjane Satrapi (2000)

21st century
 The Secret Life of Bees, by Sue Monk Kidd (2002)
 The Kite Runner, by Khaled Hosseini (2003)
 The Fortress of Solitude, by Jonathan Lethem (2003)
 Never Let Me Go, by Kazuo Ishiguro (2005)
 Indecision, by Benjamin Kunkel (2005)
 Black Swan Green, by David Mitchell (2006)
 Indignation, by Philip Roth (2008)
 Washington Black, by Esi Edugyan (2018) 
 Words of a Shaman, by Nkwachukwu Ogbuagu (2019)

See also
 Bildung
 Künstlerroman
 Mirrors for princes
 Roman à clef

Notes

References

Bibliography

 .
 .
 .
 .
 .
 .
 .
 .
 .
 .
 .
 .
 .
 .
 .
 .
 .
 .
 .
 .
 .

Further reading
 
  Revised edition, with bibliographic updates by Charles Bane and Sean M. Flory (Scarecrow Press, 2006).

External links

 The Bildungsroman Project - academic digital humanities project featuring user-submitted articles on genre exemplars and contemporary personal narratives, edited by English literature professor Katherine Carlson

 
Film genres
Literary genres
1810s neologisms